Bader Al Kharashi [بدر الخراشي in Arabic] (born 13 June 1982) is a Saudi football player. who currently plays for Al-Faisaly.

References 

Al Hilal SFC players
1982 births
Living people
Al-Ahli Saudi FC players
Al-Raed FC players
Al-Hazem F.C. players
Al-Faisaly FC players
Al-Taawoun FC players
Al-Wehda Club (Mecca) players
Saudi Arabian footballers
Association football forwards